Li Gen (Chinese: 李艮; Pinyin: Lǐ Gèn) is a character featured within the famed classic Chinese novel Investiture of the Gods (more commonly known as Fengshen Yanyi).

As a yaksha, Li Gen is the number one investigator under the East Sea Dragon King Ao Guang. In appearance, Li Gen is a lizard like creature with long mercury red hair, protruding fangs, and a face the color of indigo.

After the celestial being Nezha had been washing himself within the Nine Curve River - which had upset Ao Guang's Crystal Palace to an abnormal extent - Li Gen would be sent out to investigate, as like he should. When Li Gen found Nezha and concluded that he would make a delicious meal for his master, he began to bark at Nezha for his actions. After being called a beast in an undermining way by Nezha, Li Gen's anger burst, leading for him to charge at Nezha with his renowned steel trident. Instantly however, Li Gen would find himself dead upon the ground after being stricken by Nezha's legendary golden bracelet.

References
 Investiture of the Gods Chapter 12 pages 140 - 141

Investiture of the Gods characters